Mount Ayr Community School District, or Mount Ayr Community Schools, is a rural public school district headquartered in Mount Ayr, Iowa. It has elementary and secondary (middle and high school) divisions.

The district is mostly in Ringgold County, while there are portions in Decatur and Taylor counties. Communities in its service area, in addition to Mount Ayr, include Beaconsfield, Benton, Delphos, Ellston, Kellerton, Maloy, Redding, Tingley, and portions of Clearfield.

, high school students from the Diagonal Community School District take their elective classes at Mount Ayr High School since the Diagonal district does not have the funds to operate elective classes.

The district mascot is the Raiders, and their colors are black, red and white.

History

When the Clearfield Community School District closed in 2014, the Mount Ayr district absorbed a portion of it.

Schools
The district operates two schools, both located in Mount Ayr:
 Mount Ayr Elementary School
 Mount Ayr High School

Mount Ayr High School

Athletics
The Raiders compete in the Pride of Iowa Conference in the following sports:

 Football
 Volleyball
 Cross Country
 Basketball
 Wrestling
 Bowling
 Golf
 Track and Field
 Girls' 1988 Class 1A State Champions
 Boys' 2014 Class 1A State Champions
 Baseball
 Softball

See also
List of school districts in Iowa
List of high schools in Iowa

References

External links
 Mount Ayr Community School District
 

School districts in Iowa
Education in Ringgold County, Iowa
Education in Decatur County, Iowa
Education in Taylor County, Iowa